Toxorhynchites minimus is a species of zoophilic mosquito belonging to the genus Toxorhynchites. It is found in India, Sri Lanka Indonesia, Malaysia, Philippines and Sumatra. When under mass rearing conditions, the larvae show cannibalism.

References

External links
Studies on the efficacy of Toxorhynchites larvae and three larvivorous fish species for the control of Aedes larval populations in water-storage tanks in the Matale district of Sri Lanka

minimus
Taxa named by Frederick Vincent Theobald
Insects described in 1905